"Spoonman" is a song by the American band Soundgarden. Written by the band's frontman, Chris Cornell, "Spoonman" was released on February 14, 1994, as the first single from the band's fourth studio album Superunknown (1994). "Spoonman" is credited as one of the songs that launched Soundgarden's career into the mainstream. The song peaked at number three on the Billboard Mainstream Rock Tracks chart and number nine on the Modern Rock Tracks chart. A remixed version of the song by Steve Fisk appears on the "Black Hole Sun" and "My Wave" singles. The song was included on Soundgarden's 1997 greatest hits album A-Sides and the 2010 compilation album Telephantasm.

Origin and recording
"Spoonman" was originally written for the soundtrack to the 1992 film Singles. At that time, Soundgarden, along with Pearl Jam, were working on the soundtrack for the film. Pearl Jam's bass guitarist, Jeff Ament, had been put in charge of creating the name for a fictional band that would appear in the film. Before finally choosing Citizen Dick for its name, Ament had compiled a list of potential names, which included the name "Spoonman". The name was inspired by Artis the Spoonman, a street performer from Santa Cruz, California, and later Seattle, Washington, who plays music with a set of spoons. Soundgarden's vocalist and songwriter, Chris Cornell, eventually used the names on the list to create songs for the film. "Spoonman" was among these, and an acoustic version was created from it. This early version of the song can be heard during a scene in the film in which a poster advertising a Citizen Dick show is stapled to a lightpost.

Rather than just leave the song on the film's soundtrack, Soundgarden began working on an electric version of "Spoonman". The song's inspiration, Artis the Spoonman, played a prominent role in the song. The final version of the song featured Artis the Spoonman playing his spoons as part of the song's bridge. The drummer, Matt Cameron, also plays pots and pans on the song and the bass guitarist, Ben Shepherd, performs backing vocals.

Composition
"Spoonman" was performed in drop D tuning.The main riff was written in septuple meter, in  time. The guitarist, Kim Thayil, has said that Soundgarden usually did not consider the time signature of a song until after the band had written it and said that the use of odd meters was "a total accident".

Lyrics
Cornell on "Spoonman":

Release and reception
The band played "Spoonman" while on its 1993 tour with Neil Young. With hype building around the band's upcoming album Superunknown, Soundgarden released the single in 1994, a month before the album's release, with a previously unreleased B-side titled "Exit Stonehenge". On the choice of "Spoonman" as the album's first single, Shepherd called it a "great first choice", adding that "it just jumps out at you instantly". Shepherd said, "You know how you listen to a record and there is one song that literally seems to leap out of the speakers—well, 'Spoonman' did that to me." Shortly after the single's release, the song became widely popular, reaching high positions on rock charts. The song peaked at number three on the Billboard Mainstream Rock Tracks chart and number nine on the Billboard Modern Rock Tracks chart. At the 1995 Grammy Awards, "Spoonman" received the award for Best Metal Performance.

Outside the United States, the single was released commercially in Australia, Canada, Germany and the United Kingdom. In Canada, the song reached number 12 on the Canadian singles chart, reached the UK Top 20, peaked at number 23 on the Australian Singles Chart, reached the top 30 in Ireland and the top ten in New Zealand.

In 2017, Billboard ranked the song number 12 on its list of the 15 greatest Soundgarden songs, and, in 2021, Kerrang ranked the song number five on its list of the 20 greatest Soundgarden songs.

"Spoonman" appears in the 2001 video game ATV Offroad Fury for the PlayStation 2. The song is also used in the 2008 video games Battle of the Bands, Rock Band 2, and as a cover in Rock Revolution. The following year, the song appeared on the soundtrack of the PSP game Rock Band Unplugged, which included a number of tracks from Rock Band 2. Despite the inclusion on the Unplugged track list, Spoonman did not export from Rock Band 2 to Rock Band 3 dbecause of licensing conflicts. It appeared again on the track list of the 2012 downloadable game Rock Band Blitz and became playable in Rock Band 3 as part of the Blitz song pack. The song is also available as downloadable content for Guitar Hero: Warriors of Rock as part of the Telephantasm album pack and for Fantasia: Music Evolved.

Music video
The music video for "Spoonman" was directed by Jeffrey Plansker (under the alias "John Smithey"). The video features Artis prominently, making him the focus of the video instead of the band, who are shown only in black-and-white still photographs. The video was released in February 1994.

In an interview with Hit Parader magazine in 1994, Chris Cornell said about the music video:
I think we were fairly smart with "Spoonman" in that you really don't see us that much in the video. You see various pictures of us, but it's not quite the same as having us in your living room all the time. We're trying to maintain some degree of mystique about Soundgarden, I guess. I remember back when I was a kid, long before MTV, and the only way to see my favorite bands was to go to their concerts. It was an incredible experience. MTV has helped a lot of bands, but they've also helped rob a lot of groups of that special mystique. It's tough when you can see a great rock band on TV one second, then hit the clicker and be watching a soap opera or a sitcom the next. That's what rock and roll has become for some people.

Track listings
All songs were written by Chris Cornell, except where noted.

CD (Europe) and 12-inch vinyl (Europe)
 "Spoonman" – 4:06
 "Fresh Tendrils" (Matt Cameron, Cornell) – 4:16
 "Cold Bitch" – 5:01
 "Exit Stonehenge" (Cameron, Cornell, Ben Shepherd, Kim Thayil) – 1:19

Cassette (UK) and 7-inch vinyl (UK)
 "Spoonman" – 4:06
 "Fresh Tendrils" (Cameron, Cornell) – 4:16

CD (Germany)
 "Spoonman" (edit) – 3:51
 "Cold Bitch" – 5:11
 "Exit Stonehenge" (Cameron, Cornell, Shepherd, Thayil) – 1:19

CD (Australia and Canada)
 "Spoonman" – 4:06
 "Cold Bitch" – 5:01

Charts

References

External links
 
 

1994 singles
1994 songs
A&M Records singles
Grammy Award for Best Metal Performance
Song recordings produced by Chris Cornell
Song recordings produced by Matt Cameron
Song recordings produced by Michael Beinhorn
Songs about indigenous peoples
Songs about musicians
Songs written by Chris Cornell
Soundgarden songs
Spoons